The Canon EF 35-135mm 3.5-4.5 is an EF mount wide-to-normal zoom lens which was introduced in 1988. 

In 1990 Canon announced the EF 35-135mm 4-5.6 USM lens, featuring a different optical and physical design, and a ring USM AF motor. The new lens replaced the original and was billed as an ideal compact travel lens.

Specifications

References

Canon EF lenses
Camera lenses introduced in 1988
Camera lenses introduced in 1990